Trasquera is a comune (municipality) in the Province of Verbano-Cusio-Ossola in the Italian region Piedmont, located about  northeast of Turin and about  northwest of Verbania, in the Val Divedro, on the border with Switzerland.

Trasquera borders the following municipalities: Bognanco, Crevoladossola, Domodossola, Varzo, Zwischbergen (Switzerland).

References

Cities and towns in Piedmont